Suba was a Palestinian Arab village west of Jerusalem that was depopulated and destroyed in 1948. The site of the village lies on the summit of a conical hill called Tel Tzova, or Jabal Suba, rising 769 meters above sea level, and it was built on the ruins of a Crusader castle.

Biblical reference
The place has been tentatively identified with a town mentioned in the Septuagint version of Joshua 15:59. The Septuagint gives a list of eleven towns, which is missing in the Masoretic text. One of them is given as Σωρης ('Sōrēs') in most manuscripts but as Εωβης ("Eobes") in the Codex Vaticanus. The original therefore might have been Σωβης ("Sōbes"). There has also been a tentative identification with Tzova or Zobah (Greek Σουβα, "Sūba") from the Books of Samuel ( and ), but several scholars consider the identification unfounded. Both the Greek and the Hebrew spellings correspond exactly to the Arabic name of Suba.
`

History

Antiquity
Middle Bronze Age cairn-tombs were excavated in the neighborhood of the ruined Arab village, though the site itself has not yielded artifacts from before the late Iron Age.

March 2000 excavations at a plastered cave on the grounds of Kibbutz Tzova identified it as the cave of John the Baptist.

In the later Roman period, the site was possibly mentioned in rabbinical sources as Seboim.

Crusader era
It has been suggested that Suba was Subahiet, one of 21 villages given by King Godfrey as a fief to the Church of the Holy Sepulchre. In 1114, the gift was re-confirmed by Baldwin I of Jerusalem.

A "Brother William of Belmont" was mentioned in Crusader sources in the years 1157 and 1162, he might have been castellan at Belmont.

Sometime before 1169, the Crusaders built a castle there called Belmont, run by the Hospitallers. In 1170 an unnamed castellan was mentioned. Today, parts of the northern and western Crusader wall remain, as well as ruins of a tower and other structures. These include large underground cisterns, some pre-dating the Crusader period.

Belmont Castle was taken by Saladin in 1187. According to the chronicles it was destroyed by him in 1191 but no trace of the destruction was located during the archaeological investigation.

Settlement at the site continued, and it was mentioned as "Suba", a village of Jerusalem, about 1225 by Yakut.

Belmont castle was excavated by archaeologists in 1986–9.

Ottoman era 
Suba, like the rest of Palestine, was incorporated into the Ottoman Empire in 1517, and in the tax registers of 1596, there were 60 Muslim and 7 Christian families living there; an estimated 369 persons. They paid a fixed  tax-rate of 33.3% on agricultural products, including  wheat, barley, olives and grapes; a total of 3,800 akçe. In the 1500s, Suba villagers also paid taxes for the cultivation of the land of Deir Sammit.

In 1838 Suba was noted as a Muslim   village, located in the Beni Malik district, west of Jerusalem.

In the mid-nineteenth century, the village was controlled by the Abu Ghosh family. The Crusader walls and the fortifications they built in the village were destroyed by Ibrahim Pasha in 1834.

The French explorer Victor Guérin visited the village on 30 April 1863.

An Ottoman village list of about 1870 showed that Suba had 33 houses and a population of 112, though the population count included only men.

In 1896 the population of Suba was estimated to be about 360 persons.

British Mandate era

In the 1922 census of Palestine conducted by the British Mandate authorities, Suba had a population 307,  all Muslims, increasing in the 1931 census  (when it was counted with Dayr 'Amr) to 434 Muslims, in 110 houses.

In the 1945 statistics the population of Suba was 620, all Muslims, who owned 4,082 dunams of land according to an official land and population survey. 1,435 dunams were plantations and irrigable land,  712 for cereals, while 16 dunams were built-up (urban) land.

State of Israel 
During the 1948 Arab-Israeli War, the village saw fierce fighting, due to its key location near the Jerusalem highway. In late 1947 and early 1948, irregular forces of the Egyptian Muslim Brotherhood stationed in Suba took part in the fighting against Jewish forces, including attacks on Jewish traffic on the Tel Aviv-Jerusalem Road. The village was attacked several times by the Haganah, and finally conquered by the Palmach during the night of July 12–13 as part of Operation Danny.  Most of the inhabitants had fled during the fighting, and those who remained were expelled. In October 1948, the "Ameilim" group of Palmach veterans established a kibbutz called Misgav Palmach on village lands 1 km to the south. Later it was renamed Tzova.

Today Tel Tzova is a national park surrounded by the lands of the kibbutz. The ruins of the village are visible along with remains of Belmont Castle.

By 2011, the history of the village of Suba has been the subject of two books; one by Ibrahim ‘Awadallah published in Amman, Jordan in 1996, and another by Muhammad Sa’id Muslih Rumman in the West Bank, published in 2000.

Gallery

References

Bibliography

 
‘Awadallah, Ibrahim. 1996. Suba: Ihda qura Filastin al-mudammara [Suba: One of Palestine’s destroyed villages], 2nd ed. Jordan: Jam‘iyyat Suba al-Ta‘awuniyya.

 
 p. 480-481
 
   (p. 902)
  

 
 
 

 

 (p. 55 p. 76: Plate 15)

 

 

Rumman, Muhammad Sa‘id Muslih. 2000. Suba: Qarya maqdisiyya fi al-dhakira [Suba:A Jerusalem village in memory]. Jerusalem, West Bank: n.p.

External links
Welcome To Suba
Suba,   Zochrot 
Survey of Western Palestine, Map 17: IAA, Wikimedia commons 
Suba from the Khalil Sakakini Cultural Center

Arab villages depopulated during the 1948 Arab–Israeli War
Archaeological sites in Israel
Hebrew Bible places
Ancient Jewish settlements of Judaea